is a railway station in Kita-ku, Nagoya, Aichi Prefecture,  Japan, operated by Meitetsu.

Lines

Station layout
The station has two elevated opposed side platforms with the station building underneath. The station has automated ticket machines, Manaca automated turnstiles and is unattended..

Platforms

Adjacent stations

|-
!colspan=5|Nagoya Railroad

Station history
Shimizu Station was opened on March 23, 1911. The station was rebuilt with elevated tracks in 1980. On December 16, 2006, the Tranpass system of magnetic fare cards with automatic turnstiles was implemented.

Passenger statistics
In fiscal 2017, the station was used by an average of 1233 passengers daily.

Surrounding area
Chunichi Shinyo Bank head office
SHimizu Elementary School

See also
 List of Railway Stations in Japan

References

External links

 Official web page 

Railway stations in Japan opened in 1911
Railway stations in Aichi Prefecture
Stations of Nagoya Railroad
Railway stations in Nagoya